Richard Lounsbery (born in New York City in 1882, died 1967) was an American businessman. The Richard Lounsbery Foundation was set up with his family's wealth.

Early life

Lounsbery was born in New York City in 1882 into an affluent family. His father, Richard P. Lounsbery, was mostly from an English origin family which came to America during colonial times. His mother, Edith Hunter Haggin, was of Turkish origin through her great-grandfather, Ibrahim Ben Ali, a doctor who migrated from Turkey to the United States after the Russo-Turkish war. The Lounsbery family's wealth derived from the extensive business activities of Edith's father, James Ben Ali Haggin, who helped to solidify the United States position in the copper industry and played a role in developing California farmland and implementing legislation controlling the state's water rights.

Lounsbery attended St. Paul's School in Concord, New Hampshire, and graduated from Harvard College in 1906. He then joined the Haggin family business and extended activities into new areas such as importing silk from Japan. Upon his father's death in 1912, Lounsbery decided to change fields and joined the investment firm of J. B. Harris and Company.

After serving in France as an Army lieutenant during World War I, Lounsbery decided to stay there to study art.

Personal life
Lounsbery married Vera Victoroff, a Russian refugee in Paris, in 1928.

He was the cousin of the painter Ben Ali Haggin.

The Richard Lounsbery Foundation
Today, the Richard Lounsbery Foundation is a philanthropic organization which supports novel research projects, science education, and key scientific policy issues through seed money or partial support. It distributes a total of about $2.5 million each year, mostly in grants of $25,000–$100,000. The foundation takes a special interest in cooperative activities between French and American scholars.

See also
Richard Lounsbery Award
Haggin Museum

References

1882 births
1967 deaths
American people of English descent
American people of Turkish descent
Foundations based in Washington, D.C.
Harvard College alumni